The following highways are numbered 869:

United States